A snapper is a mechanical puzzle consisting of a pointed piece attached to a notched dowel and a hollow block with a secondary hole along its length through which a rubber-band is stretched (across the shaft) and tied off. A demonstrator inserts the dowel into the hollow block, hooks the rubber-band on the notch, pulls on the pointed end, and allows the dowel to snap back into place. The demonstrator hands the puzzle to an observer who cannot hook the rubber-band onto the dowel's notch. The demonstrator takes the puzzle back and makes it snap immediately. The trick is that the ends of the dowel are tapered so that the demonstrator can squeeze the fingers holding it together, causing it to snap into the block.

Construction 
Traditionally made of wood, contemporary varieties come in plastic or metal for enhanced durability.

Variations 
A variation on this puzzle inserts the rubber-band into the shaft of the block opposite the pointed piece. At least one variation allows the demonstrator to hook the rubber band and show it to observers.

See also
 Puzzle
 Mechanical puzzle

Mechanical puzzles
Magic tricks
Wooden toys